"It Grows On You" is a short story  by American writer Stephen King, originally published in Marshroots, volume 3, no. 1, Fall 1973, later revised and published in August 1982 in Whispers, and again revised for the 1993 short story collection Nightmares & Dreamscapes. "It Grows on You" was nominated for the 1993 Locus Award for Best Short Story.

Plot
The story recounts bizarre and inexplicable events that have taken place in a notorious house in the town of Castle Rock.  The house seems to take on a life of its own as new wings are added, growing in a way that seems proportionate to the awful events that occurred there. The new wings added seem to be connected to the deaths of men who, as boys, were molested by the house owner's wife.  The story also serves somewhat as an epilogue to Needful Things, as stated by Stephen King himself.

Similarities to other works
The house in the short story bears a resemblance to the mansion depicted in Stephen King's television miniseries Rose Red, which grows and builds onto itself as more and more visitors die within its halls at the hands of the ghosts that haunt it.

See also
 Stephen King short fiction bibliography

References

Short stories by Stephen King
Horror short stories
1973 short stories
Works originally published in American magazines
Maine in fiction